The Campbell Chapel AME Church is a church at 715 Atchison Street in Atchison, Kansas. It was built in 1878 and added to the National Register of Historic Places in 2003.

It is a one-story gable-front south-facing church built of red brick in 1878.  Its exterior was stuccoed and painted white in 1919.  A limestone staircase in front was added in the 1950s.

References

Methodist churches in Kansas
Churches on the National Register of Historic Places in Kansas
Romanesque Revival architecture in Kansas
Churches completed in 1878
Churches in Atchison, Kansas
National Register of Historic Places in Atchison County, Kansas